Enayatabad (also Romanized as ‘Enāyatābād) is a village in Halil Rural District, in the Central District of Jiroft County, Kerman Province, Iran. At the 2006 census, its population was 294, in 64 families.

References 

Populated places in Jiroft County